Pehlivanlı can refer to:

 Pehlivanlı, Çankırı
 Pehlivanlı, Cide